Denis Sassou Nguesso (born 23 November 1943) is a Congolese politician and former military officer. He became president of the Republic of the Congo in 1997. He served a previous term as president from 1979 to 1992. During his first period as president, he headed the Congolese Party of Labour (PCT) for 12 years. He introduced multiparty politics in 1990, but was stripped of executive powers by the 1991 National Conference, remaining in office as a ceremonial head of state. He stood as a candidate in the 1992 presidential election but placed third.

Sassou Nguesso was an opposition leader for five years before returning to power during the Second Republic of the Congo Civil War, in which his rebel forces ousted President Pascal Lissouba. Following a transitional period, he won the 2002 presidential election, which involved low opposition participation. He was re-elected in the 2009 presidential election. The introduction of a new constitution, passed by referendum in 2015 amidst calls for boycott then a dismissal of results by opposition leaders, enabled Sassou Nguesso to stand for another term. He was re-elected in the 2016 presidential election with a majority in the first round.

Early life
A member of the Mbochi tribe, Sassou Nguesso was born in Edou in the Oyo district in northern Congo in 1943. His parents are Julien Nguesso and Émilienne Mouebara. Nguesso was the youngest child in the family. His father was a notable hunter chief in Edou. He received primary education in Fort Rousset, now Owando. He studied in Dolisie Normal College between 1956 and 1960.

Military career 
He joined the army in 1960 just before the country was granted independence. He received military training in Algeria. In 1962, he returned to Congo and was reassigned to active duty with the rank of second lieutenant. A year later, he joined the Application School for Infantry, at Saint-Maixent-l'École, France whence he graduated with the rank of lieutenant. He returned to join Congo's elite paratroop regiment. He was one of the first officers of the Airborne Group, the first paratroop battalion of the Congolese Army, which was created by Marien Ngouabi in 1965. He commanded the Airborne Group, the army and the Brazzaville Military Zone (ZAB), and then headed the Intelligence department of the State Security Services. He became captain, then commander, and was promoted to colonel (1978) and later as army general (1989).

Political career

1963–1979: early positions
He was part of the 1968 military coup that overthrew president Massemba Debat and brought Marien Ngouabi to power. He was a founding member of the National Revolution Counsil (Conseil National de la revolution) in December 1968.

In 1968, Sassou Nguessou took part in the military coup led by Commander Marien Ngouabi against Debat: He was a member of the Congolese National Revolution Council (Conseil National de la révolution) established on 5 August 1968. Under the leadership of Marien Ngouabi, the group limited the president's powers, before the latter finally resigned on 3 September 1968. Ngouabi officially became head of state in January 1969.

In December 1969, Sassou Nguessou was elected as a member of the first central committee of the new Congolese Labor Party (PCT: Parti Congolais du travail). It was a communist party with a Marxist–Leninist doctrine. It was headed by Marien Ngouabi as president of the central committee, president of the republic and head of state.

A new constitution was issued on 31 December 1969, which designated the country as the People's Republic of Congo.

In March 1970, following a failed coup attempted by Pierre Kinganga, a former lieutenant who was exiled in the neighboring Congo-Kinshasa, an extraordinary session of the PCT's congress was held, during which Denis Sassou N'guessou integrated the Political bureau of the PCT.

On 18 May 1973, Sassou Nguessou who had been corps commander of the airborne group, was made Director of State Security.

In 1975, amid an economic crisis, an extraordinary session of the PCT central committee was summoned . The 8 member political bureau resigned and was replaced by a restricted "Revolutionary Special General Staff" (Etat major spécial révolutionnaire) composed of 5 members and headed by Marien Ngouabi. Sassou Nguessou was one of the 5. At the end of the extraordinary session, Marien Ngouabi asked Sassou Nguessou and 5 other members to craft a paper on the economic and political situation. The paper became known as the "Declaration of 12 December 1975". It recommended the "radicalization" of the revolution".

At the same period, he was appointed Minister of defense and security at age 32.

On 18 March 1977, president Marien Ngouabi was assassinated. Official media stated that the assassination was conducted by a commando group led by Capt. Barthelemey Kikadidi. Others claimed that the assassination was plotted by military officers within the close circle of power.

A Military Committee of the Congolese Labor Party (Comité militaire du PCT) composed by 11 officers and led by Major Sassou Nguessou immediately took power and repealed the 1973 constitution. Sassou Nguessou acted as interim head of state from 18 March to 6 April 1977, then he conceded his position to general Joachim Yhombi-Opango who became president. Sassou Nguessou held the position of 1st vice president of the committee, while retaining his position of minister of defense.

Shortly after the Ngouabi assassination, Massamba-Debat and his former prime minister Pascal Lissouba were arrested and accused by a courts martial of plotting the assassination. Massamba-Debat was executed on 25 March 1977. Sassou-Nguesso was appointed provisional president on 8 February, before being confirmed, during a special congress on 31 March 1979 as head of the central committee, President of the Republic, head of state and President of the council of ministers, for five years.

On 8 July 1979, general elections were held and confirmed the PCT as the dominant political force: the Congolese Labor Party (Parti Congolais du Travail – PCT) won all the seats in the People's National Assembly.

A new constitution was adopted by referendum, confirming the socialist foundations of the country.

1979–1991: three presidential terms
As the newly elected president, Sassou Nguesso negotiated loans from the International Monetary Fund and allowed foreign investors from France and the Americas to conduct oil and mineral extraction. 

Although he was considered by French diplomats as representative of the radical wing of the PCT and as the Soviet Union and Cuba's man, Sassou Nguessou developed and maintained strong relationships with France on which he relied to support the staggering economy. The French oil company Elf Aquitaine played an important role in the exploitation of Congolese oil fields that led to the doubling of oil production and in supporting Congolese government expenses via pre-financing loans.

He visited France in October 1979 and in July 1981 to seek economic support. In October 1980, high ranking French political figures including former president Valery Giscard d'Estaing, and former prime ministers Jacques Chirac and Pierre Messmer, were guests to the celebration of the Brazzaville centenary.

In May 1980 Sassou Nguessou signed a 20-year friendship pact with the Soviet Union and in the same year sent two delegations to China while a Chinese minister visited Brazzaville. However, the economic impact of these relationships remained marginal: France provided up to 50% of the country's foreign aid while the Soviet Union's contribution did not exceed 1,5%.

Sassou Nguesso was re-elected for a five-year term as President of the PCT Central Committee and President of the Republic at the party's Third Ordinary Congress on 27–31 July 1984, He announced the release of Yhombi-Opango. He served as Chairman of the Organization of African Unity from 1986 to 1987. In late 1987 he faced down a serious military revolt in the north of the country with French aid.

At the PCT's Fourth Ordinary Congress on 26–31 July 1989, Sassou Nguesso was re-elected as President of the PCT Central Committee and President of the Republic, and the PCT won all of the seats of the People's National Assembly. With the collapse of the socialist states of Eastern Europe, as well as influence from the French, Sassou Nguesso began to bring the country to capitalism.

In December 1989 he announced the end of government control of the economy and declared a partial amnesty for political prisoners. Over the following year he attempted to improve the failing economic situation and reduce the outrageous levels of corruption. Starting in September 1990 political parties other than the PCT were allowed and Sassou Nguesso made a symbolic state visit to the United States, laying the grounds for a new series of conditional International Monetary Fund loans later that year.

He introduced multiparty politics in 1990 and was then stripped of executive powers by the 1991 National Conference, remaining in office as a ceremonial head of state. He stood as a candidate in the 1992 presidential election but placed third.

In February 1991, a national conference began; the opposition gained control of the conference. The conference's declaration of its own sovereignty was not challenged by Sassou Nguesso. He was subjected to serious criticism and allegations during the Conference, including a claim from some delegates that he was involved in Ngouabi's assassination.

1992–1997: First Civil War and election campaigns
The first round of elections took place on 24 June, and the second on 19 July. Senate elections took place on 26 July. In the parliamentary election of June–July 1992, the PCT won only 19 of 125 seats in the National Assembly; the Pan-African Union for Social Democracy (UPADS) led by former prime minister Pascal Lissouba, was the largest party. But it could not obtain an absolute majority in the National Assembly, with the Congolese Movement for Democracy and Integral Development (MCDDI) led by former army General Bernard Kolelas in second position.

In the August 1992 presidential election, Sassou Nguesso was eliminated in the first round, placing third with 17% of the vote. He fared poorly everywhere except the north. The second round was held between Lissouba (UPADS) and Kolelas (MCDDI); Sassou Nguesso backed Lissouba, who won in the second round with 61.32% of the vote.

Lissouba became President of the Republic on 31 August and a new Cabinet headed by Prime Minister Stephane Bongho-Nouarra of UPADS, was formed on 7 August. In the meantime, a new alliance of seven parties, including the MCDDI and the Rally for Democracy and Social Progress (RDPS) was constituted. It was soon joined by the PCT, which was unhappy with the distribution of ministerial portfolios, thus ensuring a new parliamentary majority.

On 31 October, the National Assembly approved a motion of no confidence against Bongho-Nouarra who resigned. On 17 November, President Lissouba dissolved Parliament, announcing elections to break the deadlock. In December, Claude Antoine Dacosta was appointed Prime Minister at the head of a transitional government.

Civil war started in November 1993, when the opposition parties (UDR and PCT) contested the results of the parliamentary elections (October 1993) giving victory to the coalition supporting President Lissouba (Tendance présidentielle). Armed militia supporting President Lissouba, (Cocoyes, Zoulous and Mambas) clashed with Kolelas' Ninjas and Sassous Nguessou's Cobras. The conflict ended in December 1995, but left at least 2000 dead and more than 100 000 displaced.

After this episode Sassou spent seven months in Paris in 1996, returning on 26 January 1997 to contest the presidential election scheduled for July.

1997–2008: Second Civil War and return to the presidency
The second round of the civil war erupted a few weeks before the presidential election.

In May 1997, a visit by Sassou Nguesso to Owando, Yhombi-Opango's political stronghold, led to the outbreak of violence between his supporters and those of Yhombi-Opango. On 5 June 1997, government forces surrounded Sassou Nguesso's home in the Mpila section of Brazzaville, attempting to arrest Pierre Aboya and Engobo Bonaventure, who had been implicated in the violence. Fighting broke out between government forces and Cobras, which led to the second civil war.

At the beginning of the conflict, Kolelas' militia remained neutral, but on 8 September 1997, he joined the president's camp and became Prime Minister. On 18 September, Angolan troops and airforce entered the battle, providing significant support to Sassou-Nguessou. By 14 October a final assault covered by Angolan Mig aircraft was launched on the Presidential Palace and neighborhoods in south Brazzaville, then on Pointe Noire, against the President's militias (Zoulou, Cocoys, Aubervillois and Mambas) and the Ninjas.

By October, Sassou Nguesso was in control, while Lissouba as well as Kolelas and Opango left the country. On 25 October 1997, Sassou Nguessou was sworn in.

He repealed the 1992 Constitution, and replaced it with a "Fundamental Act" that concentrated power in the President's hands. General Sassou-Nguesso accumulated the functions of President of the Republic, Head of State, Head of Government, Minister of Defense and Supreme Chief of the Armies.

A government was announced on 2 November 1997; it consisted mainly of members and relatives of the FDU (Forces Démocratiques unifies, a coalition between the PCT and other parties supporting Sassou Nguessou) as well as two members respectively of UPADS and MCDDI, who were not chosen by the presidents in exile.

He also called for a National reconciliation forum. However The idea was rejected by Lissouba's followers who continued to strike into the region between the country's economic capital, Pointe Noire and Brazzaville, having cut the railway between the coast and Brazzaville for three months. In December 1997 heavy fighting resumed in the capital's southern suburbs (the Pool area) where the Ninja militia clashed with Congolese and Angolan troops and Cobra militiamen. As many as 1 500 may have been killed in the fighting, and thousands more fled to escape the violence.

The Forum for Unity and National Reconciliation was held from 5 to 8 January 1998 with 1,420 delegates. It decided upon a transitional period of three years, to be followed by elections under a new Constitution. It also formed a 75-member National Transitional Council (NTC) to act as a legislative body. Members were elected by the forum by mid-January . However, violence did not end. By April 1998, militias opposed to Sassou-Nguesso were operated throughout southern Congo, coordinating their operations. In the beginning of 1999, the violence had resumed in Brazzaville. Peace agreements were signed on 25 December under the auspices of President Omar Bongo of Gabon, ending the civil war, leaving 8,000-10,000 dead, around 800,000 displaced persons and a devastated country .

 Presidential elections were held on 10 March 2002. 12 candidates entered the race, but only seven remained throughout the electoral process., Two candidates were disqualified by the Supreme Court on 10 February 2002 while two (Martin Mberi and General Anselme Makoumbou) withdrew from the race, on 6 March, protesting a lack of transparency in the electoral process. On 10 March, two days before the election, Andre Milongo, seen as the main challenger, withdrew, also citing lack of transparency and calling for a boycott.

The elections passed peacefully and Sassou-Nguessou won with 89.41% of the votes. Serious malfunctions and acts of manipulation in a few electoral commissions were reported by the European Union Election Observation Mission who reported that these acts did not impact the final result, and called for the sanction of the those responsible in order to prevent the situation from happening again in the next elections.

Sassou-Nguessou was elected Chairman of the African Union, the OAU's successor body, in January 2006. His election was the result of a compromise reached to prevent the chairmanship from going to Omar al-Bashir.

2009–2016: Re-election and constitutional referendum

Sassou Nguesso was re-elected as President of the Central Committee of the PCT at the party's Fifth Extraordinary Congress in December 2006. He was re-elected in the July 2009 presidential election with 78.61% of the vote amidst an opposition boycott. He said that his re-election meant continued "peace, stability and security", and he called for an end to "thinking like ... freeloaders" in reference to international aid. At his inauguration Sassou Nguesso announced that he would support an amnesty bill to pardon Lissouba, who had gone into exile after his 1997 ouster and was convicted of crimes in absentia. Sassou Nguesso said that he wanted the amnesty bill to be presented to Parliament by the end of 2009. As Congo-Brazzaville prepared to celebrate the 50th anniversary of its independence from France in 2010, Sassou Nguesso noted that the country had far to go in fully realizing the dream of independence: "Our country will not be totally independent until our people are free of the yoke of poverty."

On 27 March 2015 Sassou Nguesso announced that his government would hold a referendum to change the 2002 constitution, which would allow him to run for a third consecutive term. The proposal was overwhelmingly approved by voters, with 92.96% in favor. Turnout was officially placed at 72.44%. However the opposition argued that due to low turnout, the results should be annulled.

On 20 March 2016, Sassou Nguesso, ran for a third consecutive term of 5 years and was reelected in the first round with 60% of the vote.

Opposition leader Guy-Brice Parfait Kolelas finished second with 15 percent of the vote while retired general Jean-Marie Mokoko, a former security adviser to Sassou Nguesso, came third with 14 percent.

For the first time in the history of the Republic, these elections were supervised by an independent commission (CNEI: Commission Nationale Electorale Indépendante). The opposition rejected the outcome, alleging fraud and calling for civil disobedience.

2021: Re-election

During the presidential election that took place on 21 March 2021, Sassou Nguessou, who faced six challengers for the presidency, came first once again, garnering 88.4% of the votes. His main challenger, Guy Brice Parfait Kolélas, finished second with 7.96%, Mathias Dzon received 1.92%, and the other four candidates each received less than 1% each.

African Union and the Libyan crisis
As the Chairman of the African Union High Level Committee on Libya, Sassou Nguesso stated, "The settlement of the Libyan crisis appears, more than ever, as an absolute urgency", especially because of the possible negative impact of terrorist groups in the south of Libya on neighboring states.

He declared "this crisis remains, before any other consideration, an African problem."

Controversies
In September 2006, during the United Nations General Assembly meeting, Sassou Nguesso's entourage, including several members of his family, occupied 44 rooms at the Waldorf Astoria that together cost £130,000, including almost £14,000 of room service. The total was pointed out by the British newspaper The Sunday Times to be "comfortably more than the £106,000 that Britain gave the Republic of Congo in humanitarian aid in 2006."  

In July 2007, British NGO Global Witness published documents that show that the President's son, Denis Christel Sassou Nguesso, may have spent hundreds of thousands of dollars from the country's oil sales on shopping sprees in Paris and Dubai. The documents show that in August 2006, Denis Christel, who was the head of Cotrade – the marketing branch of Congo's state oil firm SNPC – spent $35,000 on purchases from designers such as Louis Vuitton and Roberto Cavalli. Reputation management company Schillings Solicitors unsuccessfully attempted to suppress this information.

In November 2020, under pressure from Chinese authorities, Sassou-Nguesso and four cabinet minister issued a decree terminating a contract with Australian miner Sundance Resources to develop the huge Mbalam-Nabeba iron-ore deposit, subsequently awarding three permits to a relatively unknown Chinese-backed company, Sichuan Hanlong Group.

See also 
List of presidents of the Republic of the Congo

References

External links

|-

|-

|-

1943 births
Chairpersons of the African Union
Communism in the Republic of the Congo
Congolese Party of Labour politicians
Living people
People from Cuvette Department
People named in the Pandora Papers
Presidents of the Republic of the Congo
Vice presidents of the Republic of the Congo
Fellows of the African Academy of Sciences
Honorary Fellows of the African Academy of Sciences
Former Marxists